was a Japanese politician and cabinet minister in the Meiji and Taishō periods of Japan.

Biography
Taketomi was born in Saga as the eldest son of a samurai in the service of the Saga Domain. After the Meiji Restoration, he travelled to Tokyo to study the English language, but soon returned to his native Saga. He participated in the Saga Rebellion of 1874 against the Meiji government. After the failure of the rebellion, he returned to Tokyo and studied at the Daigaku Nankō, and later met Soejima Taneomi who turned his interest to politics. He was one of the founders of the Kyushu Kaishintō in 1882 and the Hizen Nippō newspaper. Elected to the Saga Prefectural Assembly in 1883 and became chairman of the assembly in 1885.

Taketomi was elected to the lower house of the Diet of Japan in the 1890 General Election. Although defeated in the 1892 General Election, he was reelected in the March 1894 General Election, and served twelve consecutive terms until 1924. He was one of the founders of the Rikken Kaishintō in 1894. Over the course of his career, he moved from the Shimpotō, Kenseitō, Kensei Hontō, Rikken Kokumintō, Rikken Dōshikai, Kenseikai and finally Rikken Minseitō.

Taketomi served as director of the Commerce and Industry Bureau of the Ministry of Agriculture and Commerce and as councilor to the Ministry of Finance in 1897. He became Chief Cabinet Secretary under the Ōkuma administration in 1898.

In April 1914, Taketomi was appointed Communications Minister in the 2nd Ōkuma administration, serving in that capacity to August 1915. He was then appointed Minister of Finance in the same administration, serving until October 1916. Taketomi was appointed to a seat in the House of Peers in 1924.

References

External links

Biography at National Diet Library

1856 births
1938 deaths
People from Saga Prefecture
Rikken Kaishintō politicians
19th-century Japanese politicians
Kenseikai politicians
Rikken Minseitō politicians
Members of the House of Representatives (Empire of Japan)
Members of the House of Peers (Japan)
Ministers of Finance of Japan
Government ministers of Japan